Argentine Nationalist Action  Later named Affirmation of a New Argentina  was a nationalist and fascist political party in Argentina.which existed between 1932 and 1936.

History 
It was founded in 1932 as  Argentine Nationalist Action by Juan P. Ramos, and maintained strong connections with the Argentine Civic Legion and the Argentine Fascist Party. He was financially supported by the German Embassy in Argentina because he was openly anti-Semitic and pro-Nazi and of a character Nationalist, anti-communist, anti-capitalist and fascist.

The Argentine Nationalist Action declared some support for José Félix Uriburu and his government. In 1933 it was renamed Affirmation of a New Argentina, and a short time later it would become the "Labor Nationalism Party", which would be active until 1935, when the Nationalist Youth Alliance allied itself with the Argentine Fascist Party and the Labor Nacionalism Party to form the Córdoba Fascist Forces Front, which was replaced by the Fascist National Union in 1936.

References 

Argentine nationalism
Fascism in Argentina
Right-wing parties in Argentina
Fascist parties